Neeta Dhungana (born 16 September 1991) is a Nepalese actress.
Neeta has been working in Nepali film industry since  teenager. She has played as an elder sister in Ajambari Nata which was released in 2008. Due to her acting and dance along with Nepali actor Jiwan Luitel in her popular Nepali film Notebook, she is popularly known "Gala Ratai Girl" which was shot in Ilam, Nepal.

Personal life 
Dhungana is married to popular Nepali astrologer Harihar Adhikari.

Filmography

Awards

References

Living people
1991 births
Nepalese film actresses
Nepalese female models
Actresses in Bhojpuri cinema
21st-century Nepalese actresses
Place of birth missing (living people)
Nepalese child actresses
Ratna Rajya Laxmi Campus alumni